General elections were held in the Netherlands on 6 March 1888. The Liberal Union emerged as the largest party, winning 46 of the 100 seats in the House of Representatives.

Background
This was the first election held after the constitutional revision of 1887, achieved by Minister of the Interior Jan Heemskerk, which had several effects on the parliamentary system. Firstly, this revision fixed the number of seats in the House of Representatives at 100. Secondly, it abolished multi-seat electoral districts except in large cities in favour of single-seat districts, thus allowing for better representation of geographically concentrated political minorities. Thirdly, the revision ensured all members of the House of Representatives would be elected simultaneously every four years, replacing the previous system of staggered elections. Finally, the change greatly extended suffrage and allowed for gradual further extension by law.

The election was won by the confessional parties, leading to the first Coalition government, combining Anti-Revolutionaries and Catholics, led by Æneas, Baron Mackay, thus heralding a period of Antithesis as championed by Abraham Kuyper, in which government alternated between secular liberals on the left and confessional Anti-Revolutionaries and Catholics on the right. The election also saw the first socialist elected into the House of Representatives, with Ferdinand Domela Nieuwenhuis, leader of the Social Democratic League, being elected in a rural Frisian district.

Results

By district
  Social Democratic  
  Liberal  
  Conservative  
  Anti-Revolutionary  
  Catholic

References

General elections in the Netherlands
Netherlands
1888 in the Netherlands
Election and referendum articles with incomplete results
March 1888 events